Jana Havlová (born ) is a retired Czech female volleyball player. She was part of the Czech Republic women's national volleyball team.

She participated at the 2002 FIVB Volleyball Women's World Championship in Germany. On club level she played with Olymp Prague.

Clubs 
 Olymp Prague                    (2001)

References

External links 
http://www.cev.lu/Competition-Area/PlayerDetails.aspx?TeamID=3412&PlayerID=16877&ID=223

1978 births
Living people
Czech women's volleyball players
Wing spikers